Nanto may refer to:

Places
 Nanto, Veneto, a municipality in Italy
 Nantō, Mie, a town in Japan
 Nanto, Toyama (南砺), a city in Japan
 Nanto (南都), an historical synonym for Nara, Nara, Japan

Other uses
 Nanto Bank, a Japanese regional bank headquartered in Nara Prefecture
 Nanto Rokushū, a Japanese academic Buddhist sect
 Nanto Seiken (南斗聖拳 - "Sacred Fist of the South Dipper"), a fictional martial arts style
 Nanto Shichi Daiji (南都七大寺), The Seven Great Temples of Nanto
 Dipper (Chinese constellation) , one of the twenty-eight mansions of the Chinese constellations

See also
 Nanto-Bordelaise Company, a French company formed in 1839
 Nantou City, a city in Taiwan
 Nantou County, a county in Taiwan
 Nanton (disambiguation)
 Nantong